Arre may refer to:
 Arre (brand), an Indian online entertainment platform by U Digital Content Pvt Ltd
 Arre, Padua, a municipality in the Province of Padua, Italy
 Arre, Gard, a commune in Gard, France
 Arre, a tributary of the Hérault river in France
 ARRE, Assault Regiment, Royal Engineers, a unit of the British Royal Engineers, part of the 79th Armoured Division during World War II

See also
 Årre, small town in southwestern Jutland, Denmark